The 2019 CWL Pro League was the Call of Duty: Black Ops 4 league on PlayStation 4 which took place from February through July, 2019.

Format
The 2019 CWL Global Pro League will consist of a single stage, with 16 teams from North America, Europe and the APAC region participating. The 16 teams will be split into 2 different divisions. Unlike previous years, teams will also play against teams from the other division. Teams will be able to make changes to their roster throughout the season, with matches being broadcast on Monday through Thursday. The top teams will qualify for the CWL Finals.

Tiebreakers
In the event of two or more teams having the same win–loss record at the conclusion of the Regular Season, final placing will be determined via tiebreaker rules. Tiebreaker rules in order:

Head to head match win percentage (Matches won vs tied teams / matches played vs. tied teams)
Head to head game win percentage (Games won vs tied teams / games played vs. tied teams)
Divisional match win percentage (Matches won vs same division teams / matches played vs same division teams)
Divisional game win percentage (Games won vs same division teams / games played vs same division teams)
Overall game win percentage (overall games won / overall games played)

If these tiebreakers cannot break a tie, the tied teams will be scheduled to play a best-of-five round-robin tiebreaker. A coin-flip will determine which team will act as home and away for pick ban process. After each team has played all other tied Teams in the tiebreaker, their records of games won and games lost will be used to break the tie.

If there is a tie involving  more than two teams and a tiebreaker resolved the tie for a team(s), but leaves at least two teams tied, the tie(s) that remains will be broken by starting over with the Head to Head Match winning percentage tiebreaker.

Pro League
16 teams from around the world will participate in the CWL Pro League. The top four teams from CWL Las Vegas will automatically qualify for the CWL Pro League while teams placing 5th - 32nd will fight for the remaining 12 CWL Pro League spots, at a qualification event that will take place in January at the MLG Arena in Columbus, Ohio.

Qualified teams

Regular season
A total of 16 teams, spread across 2 Divisions, participate during the Regular Season of the Pro League. Each team will play 22 matches: two Best of Five series against the other teams in their Division and one Best of Five series against the eight teams in the other Division. The top 4 teams from each Division will directly qualify for the Playoff Bracket while the bottom 4 teams will have to play in the Play-In Bracket. Matches will be played from February 4 through July 5.

Division A

Division B

Playoffs
The playoffs will take place from July 19–21, 2019 at the Miami Beach Convention Center.

Play-in bracket
The play-in bracket is a single-elimination bracket consisting of the teams who placed 5th–8th in their division during regular-season play. Once two teams remain in the play-in bracket, those teams will be moved to round one of the playoff bracket.

Playoff bracket
The playoff bracket is a ten-team double-elimination bracket which consists of the two teams who qualified via the play-in bracket and the top four teams from each division of regular-season play. The 4th-placed team from each division will be placed in the first round of the winners' bracket, facing one of the two teams which qualified via the play-in bracket.

Winners' bracket

Final 3
The Final 3 consists of the Winners Bracket Round 4 winners who enter in the Final, the Winners Bracket Round 4 losers and the winners of the Losers Bracket.

Prize money
A total of $2,400,000 prize money for the 2019 CWL Pro League will be distributed as follows:

References

CWL
CWL
Call of Duty competitions
Major League Gaming competitions